Echinovadomidae is a family of bryozoans belonging to the order Cheilostomatida.

Genera:
 Echinovadoma Tilbrook, Hayward & Gordon, 2001

References

Cheilostomatida